Morgan is a town in South Australia on the right bank of the Murray River, just downstream of where it turns from flowing roughly westwards to roughly southwards. At the 2006 census, Morgan had a population of 426.

History
Several Indigenous names are recorded: Korkoranna for Morgan itself, Koolpoola for the opposite flats, and Coerabko ('Katarapko'), meaning meeting place, for the bend locality. Morgan is in the traditional lands of the Ngaiawang people. Nganguruku people moved to the Morgan area when they lost access to their traditional lands further south.

The first Europeans to visit were the expedition of Charles Sturt, who passed by in a rowboat in 1830. The first Europeans to visit overland, by horseback, in March 1838, was the expedition of Hill, Oakden, Willis, and Wood. They noted a large Indigenous population. The locality was originally known to Europeans as the North West Bend, or Nor'west Bend, or Great South Bend, due to an acute change in the trend and direction of the Murray. The westward flowing stream of the river turns here to flow southward. The nearby pioneering pastoral station, Northwest Bend Station, established in the 1840s, still bears that name.

The town was proclaimed in 1878, the year the railway line from Adelaide via Kapunda was opened, and was named at that time after Sir William Morgan, then Chief Secretary, later Premier of South Australia. A large wharf was built, and Morgan, being the railway terminus (hence the name of a local hotel), became one of the busiest ports on the Murray. It handled nearly all the goods that were being imported and exported (particularly wool) to and from a vast region upstream from Morgan along the Murray and Darling rivers.  At its peak, Morgan was the second busiest port in South Australia (behind only Port Adelaide), with six trains a day carrying freight from the Murray to the sea at Port Adelaide. As road transport improved through the early part of the 20th century, river transport declined. The railway to Morgan finally closed in 1969.

Heritage listings

Morgan has a number of heritage-listed buildings, including:

 Railway Terrace: Morgan railway station and Station Master's House
 11 Railway Terrace: Post Office Row
 25 Railway Terrace: Landseer's Store
 Morgan Wharf

Modern Morgan

Morgan today is well known for its number of houseboat moorings and services, and a houseboat marina is currently under construction. A free road transport ferry service operates 24 hours for river crossings.  Just southward (downstream) from Morgan is a riverfront development named Brenda Park, which has flourished since WWII, originally as rustic shacks, but now as prestige waterfront holiday homes.

Despite these new developments, many historic buildings remain in the town. A number of these buildings have signs showing their former use and appearance. The two hotels, both historic, sit opposite each other, facing the riverfront. A caravan park is sited near the riverfront. Morgan is in the Mid Murray Council local government area, the state electoral district of Stuart, and the federal Division of Barker.

During World War II, the Morgan-Whyalla pipeline was built from the Murray River at Morgan to supply fresh water to the city of Whyalla.

The wasp Pseudofoenus morganensis Jennings & Austin 2002 (Hymenoptera: Gasteruptiidae) is named after the town of Morgan.

Gallery

See also
 Cadell Training Centre
 Murray River crossings

References

External links

 Morgan website

Further reading
Marfleet, Brian, (2006), The Morgan Project, Society for Underwater Historical Research, Port Adelaide, SA  .
White, J. W. R.; (1977), Morgan Centenary 1878-1978: Commemoration Book, Morgan Centenary Committee, Morgan, South Australia.

Populated places on the Murray River
Ports and harbours of South Australia
Towns in South Australia
Riverland